Christopher Mims is a technology columnist at The Wall Street Journal, which he joined in 2014.

Early life
Mims received a bachelor's degree in neuroscience and behavioral biology from Emory University in 2001.

Career
Mims taught English in Japan for 6 months and worked in a neuroscience lab. Mims was a science and technology correspondent and editor for Quartz. Mims was an editor at Scientific American, Technology Review, Smithsonian and Grist. Mims was also a producer at Small Mammal, where he helped director John Pavlus produce science videos for Slate, Popular Science, and Nature.

Mims covered the converging crises of the 21st century for Grist. Mims has also reported for Wired and Scientific American, and worked on various projects for the BBC, The Atlantic, and Smithsonian.

Mims was a contributing editor at MIT Technology Review between 2011 and 2012. 

On 14 July 2014, Mims, writing in the Wall Street Journal, said the password "is finally dying" and predicted their replacement by device-based authentication, however, purposefully revealing his Twitter password resulted in being forced to change his cellphone number.

Personal life
In January 2015, Taylor Lorenz announced her engagement to Mims, but they never wed.

References

External links

 

American science journalists
American male journalists
Living people
American science writers
Place of birth missing (living people)
American bloggers
American technology writers
21st-century American non-fiction writers
American male bloggers
Year of birth missing (living people)